Thiruvananthapuram City Police Mobile App , also known as TCP app, or UR Safe(TM) (previously known as iSafe), is the official mobile application for the citizens and public by the Thiruvananthapuram City Police in Kerala, India. The mobile application is developed by UST, a digital technology services company. The ‘UR Safe’ feature of the app helps people, especially women, to send instant alerts to the police control room by using the Panic Button or by a long press of volume rocker (down) key of their mobile phones  and police to arrive at the location.

Features
The UR Safe feature of the TCP application empowers the elderly and the vulnerable, especially women, to get quick help from the Trivandrum police just by a long press of the volume rocker (down) key of their mobile phones. The police control room receives the alert along with information of the location, the subscriber ID and the IMEI number of the mobile. The police then immediately dispatches help via the police CRV (Control Room Vehicle) that is nearest to the distress location. Once iSafe sends an alert to the control room, its position can be tracked until the situation is resolved. The position of the caller is visible to the police at the control room and also on tablets that the police force carries.

The app is currently available for Android phones and will soon be available on other platforms. It is being used by thousands of users in Thiruvananthapuram, including women and senior citizens. According to Thiruvananthapuram’s DIG and Commissioner of Police H Venkatesh, the app has helped the police to reduce response time to emergencies. UST Global is working on providing the app to other state police forces. The app can be downloaded from Google Play Store.

History
The UR Safe feature of the Thiruvananthapuram City Police Mobile App was launched by Ramesh Chennithala, Minister for Home & Vigilance, Government of Kerala on 6 March 2015, ahead of the International Women’s Day (on 8 March), in the presence of Venkatesh H, IPS, DIG & Commissioner of Police, Thiruvananthapuram. The launch was done jointly with the Thiruvananthapuram City Police and UST Global.

Recognition
The app won the award for "Best Use of Mobile Technology" at the Elets Knowledge Exchange Awards 2015,Goa. The app was awarded in the governance category at the ceremony co-hosted by Elets Technomedia and the Information Technology Department, Government of Goa. It was recognized for improving overall police governance and public safety by empowering citizens using digital technology.

The app also won the mBillionth South Asia 2015 award in the m-Woman & Children category.

References

Mobile software
Government of Thiruvananthapuram
Metropolitan law enforcement agencies of India
Kerala Police
E-government in India
2015 establishments in Kerala
2015 software